Truman Bodden Sports Complex is a multi-use complex in George Town, Cayman Islands. It is named after Truman Bodden, a former Caymanian politician. The complex is separated into an outdoor, 6-lane 25-metre swimming pool, full purpose track and field and basketball/netball courts. The field surrounded by the track is used for football matches as well as other field sports.

The track-and-football stadium holds 3,000 people. In 2008, construction commenced on a 10-lane 50-metre pool and a facility that would hold 2,000 people. A multimedia centre was built into the pool facility as well as offices, conference rooms and a full gym.

The Cayman Islands national football team plays its international matches at the track-and-football stadium in the complex. Truman Bodden is used for summer football camps for international teams that are scouting for local players.

Truman Bodden Sports Complex hosted the inaugural Cayman Invitational Meeting on May 9, 2012.

See also

List of rugby league stadiums by capacity
List of rugby union stadiums by capacity

References

Football venues in the Cayman Islands
Athletics (track and field) venues in the Cayman Islands
Cayman Islands
Buildings and structures in George Town, Cayman Islands